Nicholas "Nico" Bodonczy is a retired Chilean-born American association football player who played in the North American Soccer League between 1975 and 1980 for the Miami Toros and Fort Lauderdale Strikers.  In 1981, Bodonczy briefly coached the Plantation High School boys' soccer team before being fired during the season.   He later served prison time for a drug charge.

References

External links
 NASL career stats

1955 births
Living people
Footballers from Santiago
American soccer players
Chilean emigrants to the United States
Miami Toros players
Fort Lauderdale Strikers (1977–1983) players
North American Soccer League (1968–1984) indoor players
North American Soccer League (1968–1984) players
Association football forwards